The 2019 PNGNRL Digicel Cup season was the 29th season of professional rugby league in Papua New Guinea. The Lae Snax Tigers won the minor premiership and the Grand Final, defeating the Hela Wigmen 15–4.

2019 season 

The season commenced in April and ended in September. Three new teams entered the league: the Mt Hagen Eagles, the Vitis Central Dabaris and the Kimbe Cutters. The Chimbu Warriors were expelled before the start of the season, having failed to improve their home ground to the satisfaction of the PNGNRL.

Teams

Ladder

Sources 
http://websites.sportstg.com/comp_info.cgi?a=ROUND&round=3&client=0-11722-0-526935-0&pool=1

References

2019 in Papua New Guinea rugby league